Apranik (fl. 651 AD) was a Sasanian military commander. She commanded the army of Yazdegerd III against the Arab invasion of 651 AD.

Biography
She was the daughter of Piran.  

When the Sasanian Empire was invaded by the Islamic Rashidun Caliphate, Apranik joined the Sasanian army to fight against them. The Persians were defeated, but Apranik took command of many surviving forces and mounted an ongoing guerrilla war against the Caliphate.  

She is said to have died in combat.

References

7th-century Iranian people
Generals of Yazdegerd III
Women in medieval warfare
Women in war in the Middle East
Women from the Sasanian Empire
7th-century women
651 deaths